The Bromsgrove Festival is a classical music festival, that has been held annually in Bromsgrove since it was founded in 1960 by Joe Stones, a violinist and the founder of the Bromsgrove String Orchestra.

References

External links

Classical music festivals in England
Bromsgrove
1960 establishments in England
Music festivals established in 1960